Rykynčice is a municipality in central Slovakia with 270 inhabitants (December 31, 2018) which is located in Okres Krupina, a district of Banskobystrický kraj in Slovakia.

History & Geography 
The current community was created in 1964 by the cooperation of Dolné Rykynčice (Hungarian "Alsórakonca") and Horné Rykynčice (Hungarian "Felsőrakonca"). He was first mentioned as "Rakucha" in written documents and he was the former local family head of Rakonczay. Later, landlords came from the familie of Palásthy, the prior of Buda and the former sovereignty at the monastery in Bzovík (in the 16th century). In 1715, the village had a mill, vineyards and 81 households. In 1828, there were 107 houses and 644 inhabitants, whose main sources of income were agriculture, fruit growing and the production of wine. Horné Rykynčice was first mentioned in written documents as "Felsewrakaucha" in 1327. The village was owned by the Palásthy family until the 18th century, where later on the Koháry and Coburg families owned goods in the village. In 1715, the village had 22 households but later  it had 58 houses and 350 inhabitants in 1828. Until 1918, the places in Hont county belonged to the Kingdom of Hungary and then came to the old Czechoslovakia (today: Slovakia).The municipality is located on the western side of the Krupinská planina highlands in the Krupinica valley. The town center is located 16 kilometers away from Šahy and 24 kilometers away from Krupina. Municipalities nearby are Medovarce in the north, Drienovo in the east, Plášťovce in the south and Hontianske Tesáre in the west.

The longitude and latitude for Rykynčice are:

Longitude: 18.970685

Latitude: 48.20334

Inhabitants 
According to the 2011 census, 313 inhabitants lived in Rykynčice, including 296 Slovaks, one Magyar and one Rome. 15 inhabitants made no statement about their ethnicity. Today, 31 December 2018 the municipality counts 270 inhabitants.

Religion 
260 residents participate in the Roman Catholic Church, 26 residents in the Evangelical Church and 3 residents in the Greek Catholic Church. 12 residents were nondenominational and for other 12 residents the denomination was not determined.

Sights 

 Roman Catholic Church "Immaculate Conception" in late baroque style from 1788 in Dolné Rykynčice.
 Evangelical church from 1764 in Horné Rykynčice.
 Arboretum Felaťa east of Dolné Rykynčice.

Personalities 

 Ján Rotarides (1822–1900), Slovak teacher and member of the Slovak national movement.

References

External links
 
 

Villages and municipalities in Krupina District